Riad Taha,  (1927 – 23 July 1980), was a Shia Lebanese journalist and president of the Lebanese Publishers Association. He was assassinated when gunmen opened fire on his car. Perpetrators were never caught, but it was widely suspected that the assassination was ordered by the Syrian Intelligence. He was the head of the Lebanese Publishers Association from 1967 until his murder.

Early life
Taha was born into a Shiite family in Hermel, Lebanon, in 1927.

Career
Taha started very young as a journalist in the magazine At Talaeh in 1945 when he was just 18. He also worked in the newspaper An Nidal wad Dunia .

In 1947, aged 20, he established the weekly Akhbar al 'Aalam (meaning the News of the World) and was in Palestine in 1948 to cover the war there. In 1949, he established in Lebanon the Orient News Agency, one of the first ever privately owned Arab news agencies.

In 1950, he started the publication Al Ahad magazine (literally The Sunday) which was unique with pioneering effort in its content and its supplements. He was also editor of the magazine which opposed the Baghdad Pact. Taha became an advocate of the Egyptian President Gamal Abdel Nasser during this period. In 1953, he launched the newspaper Al Bilad (meaning The Country).

In 1955, he founded the newspaper Al Kifah (literally The Struggle) and his own publishing house called Dar al Kifah that consolidated all his publishing activities. His also authored many books including:
1950: Shafataan Bakheelataan
1958: Fi Tareeq al Kifah
1963: Filisteen al Yawm, La Ghadan
1973: Al I'laam wal Ma'raka
1974: Qissat al Wahda wal Infisal

He was elected head of the Lebanese Publishers Association, a post he would hold continuously until his assassination in 1980.

Assassination
Taha was killed in Beirut in July 1980. Although there have been rumors that Syrian intelligence killed him, there is also another report, stating that Taha was killed due to the feud between his family and another Shiite family.

See also
List of assassinated Lebanese people

References

1927 births
1980 deaths
Assassinated Lebanese journalists
Assassinated Lebanese newspaper publishers (people)
Lebanese newspaper founders
Lebanese Shia Muslims